Main Crater is the topographic feature that rises to about  and forms the primary summit crater of Mount Erebus on Ross Island, Antarctica. Inner Crater, which lies within Main Crater, contains an anorthoclase–phonolite lava lake.

References

Volcanoes of Ross Island